Husn Ka Daku is a 1929 action adventure silent film directed by A. R. Kardar. The film, also called Mysterious Eagle was made by Kardar's Playart Phototone. Kardar acted in this, his first production from Playart Phototone. Playart Phototone was a progression from United Player's Corporation, which he had set up in 1928. Husn Ka Daku was Kardar's debut directorial venture. It set the foundations for the Lahore film industry in the Bhati Gate area of Lahore. The director of photography was D. D. Dabke.

The film starred A. R. Kardar and Gulzar in the lead, with the American actress Iris Crawford, M. Ismail, G. R. John and Ghulam Kadir forming the ensemble cast.

Cast
 A. R. Kardar
 M. Ismail
 Iris Crawford
 G. R. John
 S. F. Shaw
 Ghulam Qadir

Release
The film saw its release at Deepak Cinema, in the Bhati Gate area of Lahore on 12 July 1930. According to Haroon Khalid the film collected "48 rupees, 6 anna and 3 paisa" in the first week.

References

External links

1929 films
Lollywood
Indian silent films
Films directed by A. R. Kardar
Indian black-and-white films
Indian action adventure films
1920s action adventure films